Ilias Emilian Chair (born 30 October 1997) is a professional footballer who plays as an attacking midfielder for  club Queens Park Rangers. Born in Belgium, he plays for the Morocco national team.

Early life
Ilias Chair was born in Antwerp in Belgium to a Moroccan father and Polish mother.

Club career

Early career
Chair began his career in the youth system at Lierse. He also spent time at the academy of Club Brugge, as well as the JMG Academy Belgium. Chair made his professional debut for Lierse at the age of 17, playing in the Belgian Second Division, when he came as a 76th-minute substitute in Lierse's 1–1 away draw at Coxyde on 9 August 2015. He subsequently started his first match a month later, on 9 September 2015, playing the full 90 minutes in a 3–2 home defeat to Cercle Brugge.

Queens Park Rangers
Chair went on trial at Championship club QPR in January 2017. During the trial period, he scored in a 3–1 friendly win for the U23s against Bournemouth. He subsequently signed for QPR on a permanent basis on 31 January 2017. Chair was added to the club's Elite Development Squad and spent the remainder of the 2016–17 season playing for the club's U23 team. 

Having impressed QPR manager Ian Holloway in training, Chair was named as a substitute in club's first round EFL Cup tie against Northampton Town at Loftus Road on 8 August 2017. He replaced Luke Freeman in the 63rd minute of the match to make his first-team debut. Chair made his first starting appearance for QPR in a 1–0 defeat against Preston North End at Deepdale on 2 December 2017. He signed a two-year contract extension with the club on 9 February 2018, keeping him at the club until the summer of 2020. He scored his first goal for the club during QPR's final home game of the 2017–18 campaign on 28 April 2018, scoring a volley at the far post as QPR overturned a one-goal deficit to win 3–1 against Birmingham City. Chair made seven first-team appearances during the season, scoring once. 

Having made eight appearances for QPR during the first half of the 2018–19 season, Chair joined League Two club Stevenage on a loan deal for the remainder of the season on 31 January 2019. He made his Stevenage debut in the club's 1–0 victory over Yeovil Town at Broadhall Way on 2 February 2019, playing the full match. Chair scored his first goals for Stevenage by scoring two long-range efforts late-on in a 2–2 away draw at league leaders Lincoln City on 16 February 2019. A month later, on 12 March 2019, he scored from within his own half in Stevenage's 2–0 home win against Swindon Town. Chair was nominated for League Two Player of the Month for March 2019 having contributed four goals and four assists during the month. He made 16 appearances during the loan agreement, scoring six times and assisting six goals. Stevenage manager Dino Maamria described Chair as "the best player that has ever worn the Stevenage shirt", as well as the best player to have ever played in League Two.

Upon his return to QPR, he signed a new three-year contract with the club in September 2019. Under new manager Mark Warburton, Chair became a key player for QPR at the start of the 2019–20 season.

On 29 January 2021, Chair signed a new four-and-a-half year deal that would see him remain at the club until 2025, with the club having the option to extend this contract by another year.

Chair started the 2021–22 season in good form and won the Championship Goal of the Month award for October 2021 after an impressive strike against Blackburn Rovers.

International career
Chair was born in Belgium and is of Moroccan descent. He was called up to the Morocco U20 squad for a week-long training camp in Rabat in June 2017. Chair represented the Morocco U23s in a 1–0 friendly defeat to the Senegal U23s on 23 March 2018. 

He debuted with the senior Morocco national team in a friendly 1–0 win over Ghana on 9 June 2021. On 6 October 2021, in his fourth appearance for his country, Chair scored his first Morocco goal with the third in a 5–0 win over Guinea-Bissau.

On 10 November 2022, he was named in Morocco's 26-man squad for the 2022 FIFA World Cup in Qatar.

On December 17th 2022, Chair made his FIFA World Cup debut in the 3rd place playoff against Croatia in an eventual 2–1 loss to Croatia.

Career statistics

Club

International

As of match played 27 September 2022. England score listed first, score column indicates score after each Chair goal.

Honours
Individual
Championship Goal of the Month: October 2021

References

External links

1997 births
Living people
Belgian sportspeople of Moroccan descent
Belgian people of Polish descent
Moroccan people of Polish descent
Moroccan footballers
Belgian footballers
Association football midfielders
Morocco international footballers
Morocco under-20 international footballers
Morocco youth international footballers
2021 Africa Cup of Nations players
2022 FIFA World Cup players
English Football League players
Challenger Pro League players
Lierse S.K. players
Queens Park Rangers F.C. players
Stevenage F.C. players
Moroccan expatriate footballers
Belgian expatriate footballers
Belgian expatriate sportspeople in England
Moroccan expatriate sportspeople in England
Expatriate footballers in England
Footballers from Antwerp